Cyclo is a 1995 film by Tran Anh Hung (who had made The Scent of Green Papaya). It stars Lê Văn Lộc, Tony Leung Chiu Wai and Trần Nữ Yên Khê.

The film won the Golden Lion at the 52nd Venice International Film Festival. It is about the hard lives of the labor force in early 1990s Ho Chi Minh City, and how people come under the influence of crime. The film is considered hard to understand because of abstract and wordless communication. However, in a review, Janet Maslin asserted that this style, which is  typical of the film director, makes the movie more memorable and successful.

Plot
The movie is about an 18-year-old boy who has been orphaned after his father died in a truck crash while at work. The father was a cyclo driver and his desire was that the son would have a better life than he had. However, after the father's death, because of the family hardship, the boy has to take over his father's job, pedaling a rental cyclo around busy streets of Ho Chi Minh City to earn a living. Living with the boy in a small house, is his old grandfather, who repairs tires, despite of his failing health, his little sister, who shines shoes for restaurant customers in the neighborhood, and his older sister, who carries water at a local market.

Their poor but peaceful lives are jeopardized when the cyclo is stolen by a gang. Having no money to pay for the robbed cyclo, the boy is forced to join a criminal organization and is under the supervision of a brooding gang leader, who is also a poet.

Meanwhile, his older sister also comes under the influence of the poet and becomes a prostitute. They develop feelings for each other. She visits his house where he is beaten by his father, who is furious about the profession he has taken. The poet brings the cyclo driver to "Mr. Lullaby," who kills a victim by slitting his throat while singing a lullaby.

Ho Chi Minh City is hit by unrest as different gangs start fighting with each other. The cyclo driver blinds one eye of the man who stole his cyclo but manages to remain unseen by anyone. He pays another visit to his employer to pay a part of his debt, but she refuses and becomes busy with her mentally disabled son who has covered himself with yellow paint.

The poet assigns the cyclo driver the job of murdering a man. His two accomplices give him a gun and teach him how to kill their intended target. They also hand him a bottle of pills to reduce his anxiety but warn him not to take too many. The poet and the cyclo driver's sister visit his childhood place. He leaves her in a nightclub with a client, and she is abused by the man. The man tries to compensate by bribing the poet, but the poet kills him and then kills himself by setting fire to the room where he lives.

Meanwhile, the employer's son is killed when he is hit by a truck. The cyclo driver gets drunk and takes two tablets of the drug he has received from the poet's accomplices. He becomes hallucinatory in the flat where he has been forced to stay, failing to carry out the job of killing the man. Instead, he covers himself with blue paint and then due to the hallucinations he mistakenly shoots himself twice. The next morning, the members of the gang find him badly injured but still alive, and the lady spares his life despite his failure because he reminds her of her deceased son. She releases him from the gang. The cyclo driver, still contemplating the memory of his father, drives his cyclo with his grandfather and his two sisters on it down a crowded road of Ho Chi Minh City.

Cast 
 Lê Văn Lộc as the cyclo, a cyclo driver
 Tony Leung Chiu Wai as the poet
 Trần Nữ Yên Khê as the elder sister of the cyclo
 Nguyen Nhu Quynh as the lady of the cyclo business

Soundtrack
The film soundtrack was written by Vietnamese composer Tôn-Thât Tiêt, who also collaborated with Trần Anh Hùng on The Scent of Green Papaya. The score received a "Best Music" award at the Festival International de Flandre in 1995.
The soundtrack also contains several well-known Vietnamese ca dao (folk songs) and other popular songs:
 Nắng Chiều - Sung and played by handicapped street performers.
 Ru Con (Lullaby) sung by Lullaby Man.
 Thằng Bờm (Little Bờm)- Sung by Sad Woman to Crazy Son. Transliteration and translation.
 Em ơi, Hà Nội phố - Sung by Thanh Lam (the lounge singer).
 Creep by Radiohead - Playing in dance club.

See also 

 Bicycle Thieves - Oscar winning Italian film about a poor working class man searching for his stolen bicycle.

References

External links

 

1995 films
1995 in Vietnam
French drama films
Vietnamese drama films
Vietnamese-language films
Golden Lion winners
Georges Delerue Award winners
1990s crime drama films
Cycling films
Films set in Vietnam
Films directed by Tran Anh Hung
Films shot in Vietnam
1995 drama films
1990s French films